Alderwood Manor-Bothell North was a Census-designated place in Snohomish County, Washington. The CDP was disbanded in 2000 United States Census, with portions incorporated into Bothell and others remaining as the Alderwood Manor CDP. The population in 1990 was 22,945 .

Geography of Snohomish County, Washington
Former census-designated places in Washington (state)